Mannan-binding lectin serine protease 2 also known as mannose-binding protein-associated serine protease 2 (MASP-2) is an enzyme that in humans is encoded by the MASP2 gene.

Function 

The Ra-reactive factor (RARF) is a complement-dependent bactericidal factor that binds to the Ra and R2 polysaccharides expressed by certain enterobacteria. Alternate splicing of this gene results in two transcript variants encoding two RARF components that are involved in the mannan-binding lectin pathway of complement activation. The longer isoform is cleaved into two chains which form a heterodimer linked by a disulfide bond. The encoded proteins are members of the trypsin family of peptidases.

MASP-2 is involved in the complement system. MASP-2 is very similar to the C1s molecule, of the classical complement pathway, and they are thought to have a common evolutionary ancestor. When the carbohydrate-recognising heads of MBL bind to specifically arranged mannose residues on the surface of a pathogen, MASP-2 is activated to cleave complement components C4 and C2 into C4a, C4b, C2a, and C2b.

See also
 MASP1 (protein)
 Mannan-binding lectin
 Mannan-binding lectin pathway (lectin pathway)

References

Further reading

External links
 

Complement system
EC 3.4.21